Ratchagan is a 1997 Indian Tamil-language romantic action film written, produced by K. T. Kunjumon, and directed by Praveen Gandhi. It stars Nagarjuna and Sushmita Sen, alongside Raghuvaran, S. P. Balasubrahmanyam, Vadivelu and Girish Karnad in supporting roles. The film released on 30 October 1997. It was the most expensive Indian film at the time of release. Notably, this marks the first and last Tamil debut of Sushmita Sen and remains the only Tamil film she has acted.

Plot  
Ajay (Nagarjuna) is an unemployed youth who always gets into trouble because of his temper. He gets heated up when he encounters anyone committing a crime; he takes the law into his own hands, beats them up and then gives them some free advice. Ajay's father Padmanabhan (S. P. Balasubrahmanyam), who works for an insurance firm, is very unhappy with his son's attitude, and tries his best to change his attitude through a meditation expert, but fails in this matter as the expert suggests that Ajay's anguish is reasonable. Ajay meets Sonia (Sushmita Sen) through his father, and she falls in love with him. What Sonia likes about Ajay is his temper and anger when he encounters anything, which is against the law. Sonia gets Padmanabhan's help to get Ajay to love her. Still, Ajay is not interested in her and seriously rejects her at first; but he later changes his mind after going through some unusual situations, and love blossoms between them.

Sonia's father, Sriram (Girish Karnad), is an industrialist who owns the Daewoo automotive manufacturing facility. He has no objection to his daughter's relationship with Ajay, but has one condition: Ajay must become employed in his factory, control his temper for three months, and not get into any fight whatsoever, even if he encounters a crime happening in front of his eyes. If Ajay cannot do this, he will not be allowed to marry Sonia. With a heavy heart, Ajay agrees to the condition; Sonia's love for Ajay deepens, and Sriram offers Ajay a job in his factory. Sriram actually has his own problems with his factory in a loss; ten of his workers are working with his rival and younger stepbrother Gnaneswar (Raghuvaran), and they hamper the progress of his factory with frequent, pre-planned mishaps. This leads to the factory's property loss.

Gnaneswar is the son of Sriram's stepmother, who gets deceived by Sriram and loses his share of his father's common business empire. Further, in unusual circumstances, Gnaneswar spends some years in jail and returns with a planned conspiracy and vengeance on his stepbrother, Sriram. Gnaneswar is now trying to put Sriram out of business, so his ten men create havoc in the factory by killing old workers and raging new workers. So, when Ajay comes to work in Sriram's factory, these ten men do the same to Ajay. Ajay keeps cool, trying to keep his promise to Sriram. But Sriram hopes otherwise; he wants Ajay to break the promise and beat up the ten men and throw them out of the factory. At the same time, Sriram hopes the imminent marriage between Ajay and Sonia will be cancelled, since he does not want his daughter to marry an angry street-fighter like Ajay. So, Sriram keeps hoping Ajay will somehow burst out. Gnaneswar's men damage an important machine to make the international Korean experts attend the problem. The plan is to kill those Korean experts so that it would become an international issue and Sriram's company would be locked out permanently, but Ajay saves those experts, and Sriram publicizes this to create a fight between Gnaneswar's men and Ajay, but it happens otherwise that Ajay still keeps cool in spite of them beating him black and blue, and Sriram's hopes are devastated. As the last trigger, Sriram uses his father's name in publicizing the issue in the factory to media so that Gnaneswar's men may think that it was Ajay's father who brought this to the media. As expected by Sriram, those ten men brutally murder Ajay's father for this.

After this, Ajay becomes furious and breaks his promise and banishes the ten men from the factory. But Gnaneswar holds Ajay and blackmails Sonia that he would kill Ajay unless Sonia kills herself by destroying Sriram's factory by bombarding it with a truck armed with a powerful Russian explosive. In the climax, Gnaneswar kills Sriram by throwing him off the helicopter; Gnaneswar gets killed when his helicopter hits the mountains; and Sonia gets saved and unites with Ajay.

Cast

 Nagarjuna as Ajay Padmanabhan (Voice-Over by actor Suresh)
 Sushmita Sen as Sonia Sriram (Voice-Over by actress Saritha)
 S. P. Balasubrahmanyam as Padmanabhan
 Raghuvaran as Gnaneswar 
 Girish Karnad as Sriram (Voice-Over by Kitty)
 Vadivelu as Dhanapal, Ajay's friend
 Sukumari as Sonia's grandmother
 Kavitha as Sonia's mother
 Subhalekha Sudhakar as Sathish Varma, the company manager
 Kevin Erik Gray as Kevin, the sales officer (one of the ten men)
 Ajay Rathnam as Mithran, the performance engineer (one of the ten men)
 Thalapathy Dinesh as Sopraj (one of the ten men)
 Mahanadi Shankar as Surla, the chemical expert (one of the ten men)
 Daljith Singh as Singh, the weapon designer (one of the ten men)
 Abu Salim as Abu Salim (one of the ten men)
 Sanjay as Sanjay (one of the ten men)
 Joseph as Joseph (one of the ten men)
 Mithran as Rishi (one of the ten men)
 Luka Varghese as Malik (one of the ten men)
 Chinni Jayanth as a police constable
 Manobala as Kanniyappan
 Dr. Rudhran as a psychiatrist doctor
 Karikalan as a police officer
 Vijay Krishnaraj as a police officer
 R. N. Sudarshan as Gnaneshwar's father
 Vinodhini as Priya
 Madhan Bob as Priya's husband
 Gopal Aravind as Aravind
 Omakuchi Narasimhan
 Gundu Kalyanam 
 Manager Cheena as MRF Santhakumar
 Soundar as a dog owner
 Joker Thulasi as a dog owner
 Kavithalaya Krishnan as an auto driver
 Mohan Raman as Junior Vikatan editor
 Alphonsa in a special appearance
 Sridhar as dancer

Production
The film was launched in January 1996, but filming only commenced the following year, in January 1997. Despite signing on established crew including A. R. Rahman along with Miss Universe pageant winner Sushmita Sen and Nagarjuna an Andhra star, producer Kunjumon signed debutant Praveen Gandhi to be the director. The producer revealed that in the direction, he saw "a young man who is very talented and full of ideas who was willing to work hard." The period in between was spent with pre-production works with art director Thotta Tharani constructing a huge set in Mahabalipuram with an elaborate bungalow and swimming pool as a part of the heroine's home, as well as a huge five star hotel where the villains lived and a landing area for helicopters. To shoot the helicopter scene, another helicopter with the cameraman flew above the helicopter with the villain in it.

Furthermore, Tharani created 8 sets for the song "Love Attack", with Nagarjuna and Sushmita dancing alongside 50 other dancers. The song "Mercury Pookkal Model Nilakkal" was picturised in the midst of many small aeroplanes in Bangalore. The film was shot all over India, including locations in Manali, Mumbai, Goa, Ooty, Rajasthan and Delhi, with  Kunjumon making a claim during filming stages that the film would become India's most costly production. However, this record was broken when Shankar's Jeans released the very next year. Nagarjuna's voice was dubbed by actor Suresh.

Release 
The film was initially slated to be released on 31 July 1997, but the strikes in the Tamil film industry delayed such plans. The film was released in Tamil Nadu, along with the Telugu dubbed version Rakshakudu in Andhra Pradesh on 30 October 1997.

Soundtrack
The soundtrack featured eight songs and a theme song composed by A. R. Rahman. The lyrics were written by Vairamuthu and Vaali. Hindi company, Sony music T-Series, bought the music rights of the film in 1997.

Tamil version

Telugu version

References

External links
 

1997 films
Indian romantic action films
1990s Tamil-language films
Films scored by A. R. Rahman
Films about automobiles
Films shot in Mumbai
Films shot in Goa
Films shot in Ooty
Films shot in Rajasthan
Films shot in Delhi
Films with screenplays by Crazy Mohan
1997 directorial debut films
Films directed by Praveen Gandhi